Trichosea leucotaenia is a moth of the family Noctuidae. It is endemic to Buru, Indonesia .

Pantheinae
Moths described in 1924